Big Air Freestyle is a 2002 motorcycle racing video game developed by Paradigm Entertainment and published by Infogrames in 2002. The game is an enhanced port of the PlayStation 2 title MX Rider, without the FIA license. The game also comes with a demo for Godzilla: Destroy All Monsters Melee.

Reception

The game received "mixed" reviews according to the review aggregation website Metacritic. It was a runner-up for GameSpots 2002 "Worst Game on GameCube" award, which went to Jeremy McGrath Supercross World.

References

External links

2002 video games
GameCube-only games
Racing video games
Video games developed in the United States
Multiplayer and single-player video games
GameCube games
Paradigm Entertainment games
Infogrames games